The Extraordinary Journey of the Fakir is a 2018 adventure comedy film directed by Ken Scott and starring Dhanush and Erin Moriarty. It is based on a novel by Romain Puertolas titled The Extraordinary Journey of the Fakir Who Got Trapped in an Ikea Wardrobe, which was originally written in French. The film was shot in India, Belgium, France and Italy.

The film released on 30 May 2018 in France. It was released in India, USA, Canada, Singapore and Malaysia on 21 June 2019. It was released in 7 different languages; English, French, Hindi, Tamil, Telugu, Malayalam and Kannada.

Plot 
Ajatashatru "Aja" Lavash Patel (Dhanush), who has lived all his life in a small Mumbai neighborhood, is a street magician and trickster who tricks people into believing that he possesses special magic powers. He narrates his story to three kids caught by police and are now going for a four year judicial custody.

After his mother's untimely death, he sets off on a journey to find his estranged father in Paris with a fake EUR 100 note. There, he meets a woman named Marie Riviere (Erin Moriarty) in a furniture store whom he initially swindles, but is quickly attracted to her personality. Aja then experiences a series of wide-ranging adventures around the world, initially in an IKEA wardrobe to London, England, then a Louis Vuitton suitcase to Rome, Italy, and a hot air balloon to a ship heading to Tripoli, Libya. In the ship, he gets robbed the money he earned by selling the shirt on which he wrote an emotional incident from his childhood. In Libya, he meets a Somali man named Wiraj (Barkhad Abdi), an illegal immigrant whom he met on the way to London. Together with Wiraj and group of other friends he gets back the money. In the refugee camp where Wiraj lives, he distributes all the money to the people in the camp. He has just enough money for a fake passport and ticket to India. But before going to India he goes to Paris where he meets Marie, who is now dating another guy.

He comes back to India and starts working as a teacher in school. One day Marie comes to the school and tells Aja that she has left her fiance, and then they kiss. And with this he ends his story to the three kids. He then offers those kids to be pardoned for the four year custody if they attend Aja's school daily, which they agree to.

Just before the movie ends, one of Aja's colleagues asks "Was that a true story?" and Aja replies "Only the important parts.".

Cast 
Dhanush as Ajatashatru "Aja" Lavash Patel
Hearty Singh as young Aja
Bérénice Bejo as Nelly Marnay
Erin Moriarty as Marie Rivière
Barkhad Abdi as Wiraj
Gérard Jugnot as Gustave Palourde
Ben Miller as Officer Smith
Abel Jafri as Captain Fik
Sarah-Jeanne Labrosse as Rose
Kay Greidanus as Pieter
Amrutha Sant as Siringh, Aja's mom
Harshad Kumar as vegetable vendor
Rakesh Jaiswal as Doctor
Romain Puertolas as Thomas Grégoire

Production 
The film was launched in January 2016 with Iranian director Marjane Satrapi and actors Dhanush, Uma Thurman, and Alexandra Daddario in the lead roles. However, the director left the project and was replaced by Canadian director Ken Scott. Thurman's role was given to French actress Bérénice Bejo. The filming began in May 2017 in Mumbai. In its first schedule the principal photography took place in India, Brussels, Paris and Rome.

Release 
The film trailer for Australia was launched in August 2018 by Icon Films Australia & New Zealand on YouTube. For release in India the official trailer was launched on 3 June 2019 by Zee Music Company. It fetched more than 5 million views since its release on YouTube.

The Extraordinary Journey of The Fakir released on 30 May 2018 in France.
The film was released in India, USA, Canada, UK, Singapore and Malaysia on 21 June 2019. The film was also dubbed in Tamil as Pakkiri benefiting off Dhanush's popularity. The makers had previously considered the title Vaazhkaiyai Thedi Naanum Poren for the dubbed version.  The film was made available to stream on Amazon Prime Video.

Soundtrack 

The music of the songs is composed by Amit Trivedi, with lyrics by Anvita Dutt. The chorus singers are Rajiv Sundaresan and Suhas Sawant in the song
"Madaari". The Zee Music Company holds the right.

Awards and nominations 
The film won two international awards: in 2018 it won in Norwegian International Film Festival the Ray of Sunshine Award and in 2019 in Barcelona Sant-Jordi International Film Festival, it won an award for Best Comedy.

Critical reception 
The critics consensus reads, "The Extraordinary Journey of the Fakir is undermined by its mawkish indulgences, but Dhanush's charming central performance is difficult to resist." On Metacritic, the film has a weighted average score of 56 out of 100, based on 8 critics.

The New York Times stated that the film is "a bustling, whimsical voyage.”

Box office 
The Extraordinary Journey of the Fakir fared poorly at the box office, grossing $3.26 million against a $20 million budget.

References

External links 
 

2018 films
2010s adventure comedy films
English-language French films
Films based on French novels
Films directed by Ken Scott
Films shot in Brussels
Films shot in India
Films shot in Paris
Films shot in Rome
French adventure comedy films
2010s English-language films
2010s French films